Haveli Kharagpur is a town and One of the three subdivision in Munger district in the indian state of Bihar. Historically it was the centre of the medieval Kharagpur Raj chieftaincy.

Geography
It has an average elevation of 48 metres (157 feet). It is well connected from all three directions (the fourth i.e., the west side has the forest) only 20 kilometers from Bariarpur railway station in the north, 30 kilometers from Jamui railway station in the south and 14 kilometers from Tarapur in the east direction. It is close to Jamalpur Hills, its elevation is little higher than Munger, so it never suffers from flood. It is surrounded by small hills which gives the views to this city.

Agriculture
Since it lies within the Indo-Gangetic Plain area, and hence "The Gangetic Alluvium" soil is found in this area which is very fertile.
Because the land here is very fertile, people grow four crops a year. Almost anything grows at a rapid rate because of the rich soil. The most common are rice, wheat, maize, arhar, and several vegetables. Some people
also grow lentils and sugarcane although there has been a serious decline in the sugarcane plantation since the sugarcane industry crashed because of the neglect of the government.

History

It has references in Mahabharata when Pandavas had to face an exile with disguise (the agyatvas). Then Pandavas came to hide
in the hills of Jamalpur which is on the southern side of Haveli Kharagpur. People who go to Baidyanath Temple during the holy month of Shraavana start from Sultanganj and go via Tarapur but while returning
they come via Jamui and Haveli Kharagpur. It is customary to visit the Panchbadan Temple while returning.

Haveli Kharagpur has a rich history and was one of the central points of administration during and pre-British Raj. It was a coveted place for the kings who built Mansion (and hence the name 'Haveli').
According to the Bihar and Orissa District Gazetteers
Haveli Kharagpur was surrounded by Mahalat Kharagpur (an extensive estate on the revenue roll of Bhagalpur). When Raja Rahmat Ali Khan fell into arrears of revenue in 1840, he sold
Haveli Kharagpur along with Mahalat Kharagpur to Raja Bidyanand Singh. Raja Bidyanand Singh was the grandfather of the contemporary proprietors of Raj Darbhanga.

Modern History

During the British Raj, many brave-hearts from this area participated in the freedom of India movement even when it was not very influenced with the British Rule. Monghyr had huge British presence
with administration run from the fort of Monghyr. But Haveli Kharagpur remained very isolated and was a refuge to freedom fighters and strategists who wanted to bring down the government in Monghyr.
Post independence it was declared a sub-division which is Tehsil. It is the office of a sub-divisional officer (an IAS ranked officer). Bhoodan movement saw a lot of volunteers and donators from this area. Post 1980s, very little attention was given to this place which resulted in poor literacy
among masses. Local Visionaries tried to revamp by building colleges Hari Singh College, and RSK High school, but government support was not there. After decades, this place got a Jawahar Navodaya Vidyalaya and recently DAV schools has been opened as well. In the 2016 government, Polytechnic College was established. Despite being ignored by the government, it continues to be a home of hard-working people and there has been rapid rise in the economic levels of people in this area. Digital communication has played a very major role in this part.

The biggest issue impeding the progress of this place is poor-connectivity. Although it is well connected on three sides, the roads are not wide and not maintained. This results in high latency in transportation and hence lack of large scale business. There is also a huge presence of naxals which has been overlooked by every government.

Demographics
 India census, Kharagpur had a population of 26,910. Males constitute 53% of the population and females 47%. The average literacy rate is 47%, lower than the national average of 59.5%: male literacy is 55%, and female literacy is 39%. In Kharagpur, 18% of the population is under 6 years of age. Kharagpur city also has major banks and automated teller machines like the State Bank of India, Bank of India, and the Punjab National Bank.

River & Lake

There is lake known as Kharagpur Lake. It is only 3–4 km far from the bus stand in the west direction. it is a great tourist spot specially during the time of Shravan month when people return from the Baba Dham. The beautiful lake is surrounded by dense green forest that is home to rare animals.

Bhimbandh Wildlife Sanctuary is a picnic spot. The place Bhim Bandh is a natural picnic spot where Bhima (and hence the name Bhimbandh) along with his Brothers (Pandavas) stayed during agyatvas. Agyatvas (a period of disguise) was a period where they had to hide from the public and if seen they will have to be in exile for another 12 years. This is tourist place for Haveli Kharagpur hill area. It is also a picnic spot in winter season where people enjoy spring of hot water, specially during the week of Christmas, New Year, and Makar Sankranti.

Kharagpur also has Rameshwar Kund inside the Bheemm band forest.

Religious Places

There are several temples of historical importance in Haveli Kharagpur. The most prominent one is the Lord Shiva temple called "Panch badan sthan" which is unique among all the temples of Lord Shiva in the sense that one can see the five face of lord Shankar in its shivling. During the month of Shraavana it is frequently visited by tens of thousands of devotees. It is also frequently visited by the devotees returning from Baidyanath Temple.

There is a Kali Mandir in the central town which is frequently visited by locals all the year. During the course of Durga puja and Kali puja, it is frequented by tens of thousands of devotees.

Another local temple is Thakurbari, meaning place of lord Krishna.

There is a mosque which is close to the post-office and police station, it was built by Raja Rahmat Ali Khan.

Tourism
This place sees a large number of tourists during the holy month of Shraavana who return via Jamui to take the train at Bariarpur railway station. Most tourist are from Bihar because they know this place.
There are several natural attractions like Bheem Bandh, Kharagpur Lake, Devghara Hill, Panchbadan Sthan, Jodi Talai etc. Due to the lack of hotels only those people who have relatives/connections in this area can stay overnight.
To visit this place people either come via Jamiu railway station, Jhajha Railway station or Bariarpur railway station. Some trains do not stop at Bariarpur but all the trains will stop at Jamalpur which is only 16 Kilometers from Bariarpur and one can take auto service to get to Bariarpur. From both Bariarpur and Jamiu there is frequent bus/auto services to Haveli Kharagpur. Both Bariarpur and Jamiu have hotels to stay overnight.

List Of People
Nandalal Bose, famous Indian painter was born in Haveli Kharagpur.

Bina Devi is an Indian leader who became known for inspiring women to become businesswoman through mushroom cultivation. She was awarded Nari Shakti Puraskar which is an annual award given by the Ministry of Women and Child Development of the Government of India to individual women or to institutions that work towards the cause of women empowerment. Nicknamed Mushroom Mahila for popularising mushroom cultivation, Bina Devi gained respect and became the Sarpanch of Dhauri Panchayat, Tetiabambar block for five years. She has trained farmers on mushroom and organic farming, Vermicompost production and organic insecticide preparation.

Upasni Maharaj, a satguru, spent a year in Haveli Kharagpur before settling in Sakori. Upasni Maharaj was the principal teacher of Meher Baba.

References

Cities and towns in Munger district